The Kentucky Horse Park Arboretum is a newly certified arboretum located on the grounds of the Kentucky Horse Park, 4089 Iron Works Parkway, Lexington, Kentucky, United States. An admission fee is charged for the Horse Park. Guided tours of the arboretum are given at 3:00 p.m. on the last Sunday of each month, but self-guided tours may be taken at any time.

Although the formal arboretum was established in 2004, many of its trees were by then well-established, with some dating to the 18th century. It now contains more than 1,000 trees representing over 75 species. Approximately half are native to Kentucky; the others are indigenous to Europe and Asia. Markers identify the trees by both common and scientific names.

See also
 List of botanical gardens in the United States

Botanical gardens in Kentucky
Arboreta in Kentucky
Parks in Lexington, Kentucky